Elizabeth Withstandley is an American visual artist and filmmaker from Cape Cod, Massachusetts who lives and works in Los Angeles. Her work is multidisciplinary including photography, film, video and installation art. She is one of the co-founders of Locust Projects a not-for-profit art space in Miami, Florida and Prospect Art in Los Angeles, CA .

Background 
Her work has been shown at the Museum of Contemporary Art in North Miami, Florida; Oficina Cultural Oswald de Andrade in São Paulo, Brazil; Bass Museum of Art, Ringling Museum of Art, Fredric Snitzer Gallery, Nexus Contemporary Art Center, and the Visual Studies Workshop in Rochester, New York; Meyerhoff Gallery at the Maryland Institute College of Art in Baltimore, Maryland; The Moore Space, Miami, FL Galerie Valerie Cueto Paris, France, Winslow Garage, Los Angeles  The Torrance Art Museum  Dimensions Variable Miami, Florida and Antenna Gallery in New Orleans.

Artwork
Her work explores individuality and identity. Her work "You Can Not Be Replaced" is a two channel video installation that shows all 82 current and former members of The Polyphonic Spree which asks the viewer to question the idea of individualism. The idea of individualism and identity are common themes throughout her work. She organized the exhibition Smoke & Mirrors at The Torrance Art Museum with the artist Gioj De Marco in 2018. Thirteen artists were included in the exhibition exploring the line in between fact and fiction. Withstandley presented The Real Brian Wilson, a 2 channel HD projection with digital artifacts in the exhibition. "The Symphony of Names: No Man is an Island" is a video installation with 10 channel audio that is included in In-Sonora 11 in Madrid, Spain. Her 3 channel video installation "Searching for the Miraculous" is included in exhibitions at the AC Institute, VisArts Center in Rockville, MD and ExGirlfriend in Berlin Germany.

References

External links 
 

Artists from Massachusetts
American filmmakers
Living people
Year of birth missing (living people)